USS Pictor is a name used more than once by the United States Navy:
 USS Pictor (AF-27), whose acquisition was canceled on 22 May 1944.
 , acquired by the Navy on 13 September 1950 at Suisun Bay, California, and converted to a Provisions Store Ship.

United States Navy ship names